The 2010 Shimadzu All Japan Indoor Tennis Championships was a professional tennis tournament played on indoor carpet courts. It was part of the 2010 ATP Challenger Tour. It took place in Kyoto, Japan between 8 and 14 March 2010.

ATP entrants

Seeds

Rankings are as of March 1, 2010.

Other entrants
The following players received wildcards into the singles main draw:
  Toshihide Matsui
  Junn Mitsuhashi
  Hiroki Moriya
  Kento Takeuchi

The following players received entry from the qualifying draw:
 Yuichi Ito
 Sho Katayama
 Hiroki Kondo
 Sebastian Rieschick

Champions

Singles

 Yuichi Sugita def.  Matthew Ebden, 4–6, 6–4, 6–1

Doubles

 Martin Fischer /  Philipp Oswald def.  Divij Sharan /  Vishnu Vardhan, 6–1, 6–2

External links
Official website (in japanese)

Shimadzu All Japan Indoor Tennis Championships
All Japan Indoor Tennis Championships
2010 in Japanese tennis
March 2010 sports events in Japan